Bashkultayevo is a rural locality (a selo) in Kultayevskoye Rural Settlement, Permsky District, Perm Krai, Russia. The population was 623 as of 2010. There are 33 streets.

Geography 
Bashkultayevo is located 29 km southwest of Perm (the district's administrative centre) by road. Mokino is the nearest rural locality.

References 

Rural localities in Permsky District